California, the most populous state in the United States and third largest in area after Alaska and Texas, has been the subject of more than 220 proposals to divide it into multiple states since its admission to the Union in 1850, including at least 27 significant proposals prior to the 21st century.

In addition, there have been some calls for the secession of multiple states or large regions in the American West (such as the proposal of Cascadia) which often include parts of Northern California.

Prior California partitions

California was partitioned in its past, prior to its admission as a state in the United States. What under Spanish rule was called the Province of Las Californias (1768–1804), that stretched almost  from north to south, was divided into Alta California (Upper California) and Baja California (Lower California) in 1804. The division occurred on a line separating the Franciscan missions in the north from the Dominican missions in the south, with Misión San Miguel Arcángel de la Frontera set as the northern limit of Baja California and the southern limit of Alta California.

After the Mexican–American War lasting from 1846 to 1848, most of Alta California was partitioned into five U.S. states, with the western portion of Alta California admitted to the United States as the present-day State of California, and later partitions of Alta California to become Nevada, Utah, and parts of Arizona and Wyoming. Baja California Territory would absorb what was left of Alta California (which included the modern-day cities of Tijuana and Mexicali) and remained under Mexican rule. The territory was subsequently divided into two Mexican states in 1931. In 1888, under the government of President Porfirio Díaz, Baja California became a federally administered territory called the North Territory of Baja California ("north territory" because it was the northernmost territory in the Republic of Mexico). In 1952, the northern portion of this territory (above 28°N) became the 29th state of Mexico, called Baja California; the sparsely populated southern portion remained a federally administered territory. In 1974, it became the 31st state of Mexico, admitted as Baja California Sur.

History of partition movements

Pre-statehood

The territory that became the present state of California was acquired by the U.S. as a result of American victory in the Mexican–American War and subsequent 1848 Mexican Cession. After the war, a confrontation erupted between the slave states of the South and the free states of the North regarding the status of these acquired territories. Among the disputes, the South wanted to extend the Missouri Compromise line (36°30' parallel north), and thus slave territory, west to Southern California and to the Pacific coast, while the North did not.

Starting in late 1848, Americans and foreigners of many different countries entered into California in unprecedented numbers, for the California Gold Rush, rapidly increasing the population. In response to growing demand for a better, more representative government, a Constitutional Convention was held in 1849. The delegates there unanimously outlawed slavery, and therefore had no interest in extending the Missouri Compromise Line through California; the lightly populated southern half had never had slavery and was heavily Hispanic. Delegates applied for statehood with the current boundaries. As part of the Compromise of 1850, Congressional representatives of the American South reluctantly acceded to having California be a free state, and it officially became the 31st state in the union on September 9, 1850.

Post-statehood
Southern California attempted three times in the 1850s to achieve a separate statehood or territorial status from Northern California.

 In 1855, the California State Assembly passed a plan to trisect the state. All of the southern counties as far north as Monterey, Merced, and part of Mariposa, then sparsely populated but today containing about two-thirds of California's total population, would become the State of Colorado (the name Colorado was later adopted for another territory established in 1861), and the northern counties of Del Norte, Siskiyou, Modoc, Humboldt, Trinity, Shasta, Lassen, Tehama, Plumas, and portions of Butte, Colusa (which included what is now Glenn County), and Mendocino, a region which today has a population of less than a million, would become the State of Shasta. The primary reason was the size of the state's territory. At the time, the representation in Congress was too small for such a large territory, it seemed too extensive for one government, and the state capital was too inaccessible because of the distances to Southern California and various other areas. The bill eventually died in the California Senate as it became very low priority compared to other pressing political matters.
 In 1859, the legislature and governor approved the Pico Act (named after the bill's sponsor Andrés Pico, state senator from Southern California) splitting off the region south of the 36th parallel north as the Territory of Colorado. The primary reason cited was the difference in both culture and geography between Northern and Southern California. It was signed by the State governor John B. Weller, approved overwhelmingly by voters in the proposed Territory of Colorado, and sent to Washington, D.C. with a strong advocate in Senator Milton Latham.  However, the secession crisis and American Civil War following the election of Lincoln in 1860 prevented the proposal from ever coming to a vote.
 In the late 19th century, there was serious talk in Sacramento of splitting the state in two at the Tehachapi Mountains, because of the difficulty of transportation across the rugged range. The discussion ended when it was determined that building a highway over the mountains was feasible; this road later became the Ridge Route, which today is Interstate 5 over Tejon Pass.

20th century

 Since the mid-19th century, the mountainous region of northern California and parts of southwestern Oregon have been proposed as a separate state. In 1941, some counties in the area ceremonially seceded, one day a week, from their respective states as the State of Jefferson. This movement disappeared after America's entry into World War II, but the notion has been rekindled in recent years.
 The California State Senate voted on June 4, 1965, to divide California into two states, with the Tehachapi Mountains as the boundary. Sponsored by State Senator Richard J. Dolwig (R-San Mateo), the resolution proposed to separate the seven southern counties, with a majority of the state's population, from the 51 other counties, and passed 27–12. To be effective, the amendment would have needed approval by the State Assembly, by California voters, and by the United States Congress. As expected by Dolwig, the proposal did not get out of committee in the assembly.
 In 1992, State Assemblyman Stan Statham sponsored a bill to allow a referendum in each county on a partition into three new states: North, Central, and South California. The proposal passed in the State Assembly but died in the State Senate.

21st century

 In the wake of the 2003 gubernatorial recall, Tim Holt and Martin Hutchinson proposed in separate newspaper op-eds that the state should split into as many as four new states, dividing distinct geographically and politically defined regions as the Bay Area, North Coast, and Central Valley, as well as the historic Shasta/Jefferson region, into their own states. 
 In early 2009, former State Assemblyman Bill Maze began lobbying to split thirteen coastal counties, which usually vote Democratic, into a separate state to be known as either "Coastal California" or "Western California". Maze's primary reason for wanting to split the state was because of how "conservatives don't have a voice" and how Los Angeles and San Francisco "control the state". The counties that would make up the new state would be Marin, Contra Costa, Alameda, San Francisco, San Mateo, Santa Clara, Santa Cruz, San Benito, Monterey, San Luis Obispo, Santa Barbara, Ventura, and Los Angeles Counties. It has also been proposed that the state be split in two simply at the straight divide of the 120th meridian west, much like its border with the state of Nevada.
 In June 2011, Republican Riverside County Supervisor Jeff Stone called for Riverside, Imperial, San Diego, Orange, San Bernardino, Kings, Kern, Fresno, Tulare, Inyo, Madera, Mariposa and Mono counties (see map, highlighted in red) to separate from California to form the new state of South California. Officials in Sacramento responded derisively, with governor Jerry Brown's spokesperson saying "A secessionist movement? What is this, 1860? It's a supremely ridiculous waste of everybody's time." and fellow supervisor Bob Buster calling Stone "crazy", suggesting "Stone has gotten too much sun recently."
 In September 2013, county supervisors in both Siskiyou County and Modoc County voted to join a bid to separate and create a new "State of Jefferson".  Mark Baird, spokesperson for the Jefferson Declaration Committee, is reported to have said the group hopes to obtain commitments from as many as a dozen counties, after which they will ask the state legislature to permit formation of the new state based on Article 4, Section 3 of the US Constitution.  In January 2014, supervisors in Glenn County voted in favor of separation, and in April 2014, Yuba County supervisors voted to become the fourth California county to join the movement.  On June 3, 2014, residents in Del Norte County voted against separation by 58 percent to 42 percent; however, voters in Tehama County supported a separation initiative by 57 percent to 43 percent.  On July 22, 2014, Sutter County voted 5–0 to join the State of Jefferson.
 Six Californias: On December 19, 2013, venture capitalist Tim Draper submitted a six-page proposal  to the California Attorney General to split California into six new states, citing improved representation, governance, and competition between industries.  On February 19, 2014, Secretary of State Debra Bowen approved the proposal allowing supporters to start collecting signatures in order to qualify the petition for a ballot. A total of 807,615 registered voters were needed by July 18, 2014 for the proposal to appear on the ballot. On July 14, the petition organizer announced that the proposal received enough signatures to be placed on the ballot in two years; however, it was determined that only about two thirds were valid and the petition fell short of qualifying for the November 2016 ballot.
 New California: On January 16, 2018, the 501(c)(4) organization New California, organized by conservative radio talk show host Paul Preston, published its proposed state's Declaration of Independence. As motivation for the split, Preston said that he rated California "around 48th or 50th" among states for business climate; he also mentioned what he said were high taxes. His proposed New California would have included the rural counties that make up most of the state's area, leaving the more heavily populated areas around San Francisco, Sacramento, and Los Angeles. New California would also include the urban areas of Contra Costa County, Orange County, and San Diego County, bringing the population to around 20 million.
 In April 2018, the Cal 3 organization announced it had more than 600,000 signatures to place an initiative on the November 2018 ballot proposing that California should be split into three separate states. The signatures must be verified before the proposal qualifies for the ballot - this was achieved by June 13, 2018. In July 2018, the California Supreme Court pulled the Cal 3 proposal from the ballot for further state constitutional review.
In 2020, "Move Oregon's Border For a Greater Idaho" proposed breaking off most of Oregon's area and some of Northern California and join it with Idaho. The areas proposed to break off of Oregon and California vote Republican but in a state whose legislatures are dominated by Democrats. Douglas and Josephine counties in Oregon approved language for petitions to put a measure on the ballot. Even if passed by voters, it would still need approval from all three state legislatures.
In August 2022, the San Bernardino County Board of Supervisors began an approval process for a possible secession measure to be added to the November 2022 general election ballot. Proponents of including the ballot measure cite dissatisfaction in the county's share of state and federal funding.

Union with other states

Ecotopia
Writer Ernest Callenbach wrote a 1975 novel, entitled Ecotopia, in which he proposed a full-blown secession of Northern California, Oregon, and Washington from the United States in order to focus upon environmentally friendly living and culture. He later abandoned the idea stating: "We are now fatally interconnected, in climate change, ocean impoverishment, agricultural soil loss, etc. etc. etc."

The premise was borrowed / adapted by Starhawk for her novel The Fifth Sacred Thing (1993), which pitted the eco-feminist inhabitants of a future, independent San Francisco against a rival, right-wing polity centered on Los Angeles.

Cascadia

While mostly consisting of Washington, Oregon, Idaho and British Columbia in Canada, proposals for an independent Cascadia often include portions of northern California.

Californian reunification 
The reunification of the Californias or Greater California is the irredentist idea of a united California often consisting of modern-day California, Baja California, and Baja California Sur, or largely based on the former lands previously governed by the Province of Las Californias (1767-1804), including much of the American Southwest. There were fears during the Magonista rebellion of 1911 from both Americans and Mexicans of a Magonista expansion into California from, then Magonista-controlled, Baja California that would establish anarcho-communism across the Californias and inspire rebellions from Indigenous Californians against the US and Mexican governments.

Californian independence

Prior to American annexation, one instance of a Californian independence movement from a sovereign nation occurred when the California Republic was declared independent from the Centralist Republic of Mexico in 1846 during the Bear Flag Revolt during the Mexican–American War. After American annexation, there had been little to no independence movements prior to the Election of Donald Trump.

Numerous organizations advocate for the independence of California as a sovereign state. Common arguments in support of independence are often based on the fact of California having the fifth-largest economy in the world, and for being home to the global centers of entertainment (Hollywood) and technology (Silicon Valley).

California National Party

Founded in 2015, California National Party (CNP) is a political party seeking, as a long-term goal, the secession of California from the United States by legal and peaceful means. The name and mission of the California National Party are partly inspired by the Scottish National Party, a social democratic, civic nationalist, center-left party advocating progressivist policies and independence for Scotland.

California Freedom Coalition

The California Freedom Coalition is a political group, founded in 2017, advocating for the political, economic, and social empowerment of Californians. It supports universal healthcare for Californians, greater representation for California in the U.S. Congress, and more funding for education in California, as well as the possibility of Californian independence.

Yes California

In the wake of Republican nominee Donald Trump's winning the 2016 presidential election, a fringe movement organized by Yes California, referred to as "Calexit"—a term inspired by the successful 2016 Brexit referendum—arose in a bid to gather the 585,407 signatures necessary to place a secessionist question on the 2018 ballot. In July 2018, the objectives of the Calexit initiative were expanded upon by including a plan to carve out an “autonomous Native American nation” that would take up the eastern part of California, and "postponing its ballot referendum approach in favor of convincing Republican states to support their breakaway efforts." "Yes California" was founded by Louis J. Marinelli, a New Yorker who moved to Russia, and was supported by the Russian government.

See also
 Secession in the United States
 List of U.S. state partition proposals
 Secession in New York
 Texas divisionism

References

External links
Two New Californias: An Equal Division, Historical and Financial Analysis (1992), from the Golden State University School of Law, which lists a number of major partition proposals.

California secessionism
California
Separatism in the United States
Geographic history of California
Political history of California